Salta is a city in Argentina.

Salta may also refer to:

Places 
 Salta Province, Argentina, whose capital is the namesake city
 Salta, Bangladesh, a town in Bangladesh
 Salta, Cumbria, a hamlet in England
 Salta, Republic of Dagestan, a rural locality in Russia
 Sâlța, a tributary of the Iza in Maramureș County, Romania
 Sâlța, a village in Rozavlea Commune, Maramureș County, Romania

Music 
 "Salta" (song), by the Argentinian artist King Africa
 "Salta!!", a song by the Argentine-Spanish band Tequila
 Tom Salta, American composer

Ships 
 Salta, name of HMS Shah (D21) after conversion and sale into civilian service; participated in the rescue of passengers of the luxury cruise ship Lakonia
 HMHS Salta, a hospital ship sunk by a mine during the First World War
 Several ships of the Argentine Navy

Other uses 
 Battle of Salta, fought during the Argentine War of Independence
 Salta Open, a golf tournament on the TPG tour in Argentina
 Salta (game), a two-player abstract strategy board game